Matthew Laidlaw (born 9 February 1987) is an Australian rules footballer in the Australian Football League.

He was recruited as the number 51 draft pick in the 2005 AFL Draft from Oakleigh Chargers.

Laidlaw was nominated for the Cleo Bachelor of the Year 2009.

External links

1987 births
Living people
Australian rules footballers from Victoria (Australia)
Sydney Swans players
Oakleigh Chargers players